The 2019 Bolivian Primera División season, known as the 2019 Copa Tigo season for sponsorship reasons, was the 42nd season of Bolivia's top-flight football league and the second season under División de Fútbol Profesional management. San José were the defending champions, having won the 2018 Clausura tournament.

In the Torneo Apertura, Bolívar won their twenty-ninth league title and twenty-third in the professional era, with two matches to spare following a 2–1 victory over Oriente Petrolero on 16 May, while in the Torneo Clausura, Jorge Wilstermann won their fifteenth league title and eighth in the professional era following a 3–1 win against Oriente Petrolero on the last matchday of the tournament on 28 December.

Format
The season was split into a Torneo Apertura and a Torneo Clausura, played in the first and second half of the year, respectively. Both were played under a double round-robin system, with all teams playing each other twice for a total of 26 matches. The teams placed first at the end of each tournament were the champions and earned qualification for the Copa Libertadores group stage. The remaining two Copa Libertadores berths as well as the four Copa Sudamericana ones were awarded through the aggregate table.

Teams
The number of teams for the 2019 season remained the same as the 2018 season. Universitario were relegated to the Copa Simón Bolívar after finishing in last place of the aggregate table in the previous season, and were replaced by Always Ready, the 2018 Copa Simón Bolívar champions, who made their return to the top tier after 28 years.

Managerial changes

Torneo Apertura

Standings

Results

Top goalscorers

Source: Soccerway

Torneo Clausura

Standings

Results

Top goalscorers
{| class="wikitable" border="1"
|-
! Rank
! Name
! Club
! Goals
|-
| rowspan=2 align=center | 1
| Juan Miguel Callejón
|Bolívar
| rowspan=2 align=center | 19
|-
| Jair Reinoso
|The Strongest
|-
| rowspan=2 align=center | 3
| Gilbert Álvarez
|Jorge Wilstermann
| rowspan=2 align=center | 18
|-
| Carlos Saucedo
|San José
|-
| rowspan=3 align=center | 5
| Carmelo Algarañaz
|Always Ready
| rowspan=3 align=center | 13
|-
| Enzo Maidana
|Nacional Potosí
|-
| Harold Reina
|The Strongest
|-
| align=center | 8
| Juan Carlos Arce
|Bolívar
| align=center | 12
|-
| rowspan=2 align=center | 9
| Vladimir Castellón
|Bolívar
| rowspan=2 align=center | 11
|-
| John Jairo Mosquera
|Royal Pari
|}

Source: Soccerway

Aggregate table

Relegation/promotion playoff
The relegation playoff would have been played by Sport Boys, as the team placed 13th in the 2019 División Profesional aggregate table, and Real Santa Cruz, who were the 2019 Copa Simón Bolívar runners-up, with the winners playing in the top flight for the 2020 season. However, considering Sport Boys' disaffiliation from the league as well as Destroyers's relegation as the bottom-placed team in the aggregate table, and with the late conclusion of the 2019 season which made infeasible playing the playoff in early January 2020, the FBF decided on 5 January 2020 that Real Santa Cruz would be promoted for the next season as Copa Simón Bolívar runners-up.

References

External links
 División Profesional on the FBF's official website 

2019
2019 in South American football leagues
P